The Dietz C-4 was a biplane designed by Conrad Dietz.

Design and development
The C-4 (Conrad Design number 4) was a biplane design built by Dietz Laboratories. Conrad Dietz became manager of the newly formed Aeronca, using their services to modify the design for a Dayton Bear engine. The concept was proposed to Aeronca in 1929 to be the first plane manufactured by the company, but it was passed over in favor of the Roche-designed low-cost Aeronca C-2, which launched Aeronca. Dietz died in an accident in September 1931 while demonstrating an Aeronca.

The C-4 was a conventional landing gear-equipped biplane with cantilever wings.

Specifications (Dietz C-4)

References

Biplanes